Fernando "Papi" Cortés (October 4, 1909 – 1979) was a Puerto Rican film actor, writer and director. He was born in San Juan, Puerto Rico, but he spent most of his adult life in Mexico City, where he died. On 1932, while in New York City, Fernando Cortés married Puerto Rican childhood friend María del Pilar Cordero, who adopted the stage name of Mapy Cortés. The couple soon traveled to Spain with a Cuban theatrical troupe. They worked on the Spanish stage, radio and film until the outbreak of the Civil War in 1936. Fernando progressively began to take a backseat as actor and baritone and focused on promoting the career of his wife Mapy, who became a noted vedette (showgirl with star status) in Barcelona.

After the Spanish Civil War interrupted their careers, the couple worked in New York, San Juan, Buenos Aires, Havana and Caracas, occasionally starring in movies. They arrived to Mexico City in late 1940 and made their stage debut at the Teatro Follies, in a show headlined by the popular Mexican comedian Cantinflas. Despite early struggles to become household names, Mapy achieved Mexican film stardom in late 1941 and the couple settled in Mexico City. Initially, Fernando Cortés played supporting roles in his wife's films. He then made a successful debut as director with La pícara Susana (1945), a comedy vehicle for his wife.

In March 1954, Fernando and Mapy Cortés returned to Puerto Rico to help launch local television. Cortés became the first director at WKAQ-TV, Channel 2, and the couple co-starred in Mapy y Papi, the first Puerto Rican sitcom. Despite their success on local TV, the couple returned the following year to Mexico City, which offered more opportunities. The couple starred in a Mexican version of their Puerto Rican sitcom and Mapy returned to the stage. Fernando Cortés became known as a reliable director of Mexican comedies on stage, television and film. After writing and directing star vehicles for his wife Mapy in the 1940s and comedians like Resortes and Tin-Tan in the 1950s, Fernando Cortés produced and directed Puerto Rican co-productions in the 1960s and launched the film career of La India María in the 1970s.

Filmography

As actor
Doña Francisquita (Hans Behrendt, 1934)
Usted tiene ojos de mujer fatal (Juan Parellada, 1936)
El amor gitano (Alfonso de Benavides, 1936)
La última melodía (Jaime Salvador, 1939)
The League of Songs (Chano Urueta, 1941)
The Five Nights of Adam (Gilberto Martínez Solares, 1942)
Yo bailé con Don Porfirio (Gilberto Martínez Solares, 1942)
Internado para señoritas (Gilberto Martínez Solares, 1943)
El globo de Cantolla (Gilberto Martínez Solares, 1943)
La guerra de los pasteles (Emilio Gómez Muriel, 1944)
La corte de Faraón (Julio Bracho, 1944)
La hija del regimiento (Jaime Salvador, 1944)
He Who Died of Love (Miguel Morayta, 1945)
 Mischievous Susana (Fernando Cortés,1945)
El amor las vuelve locas (Fernando Cortés, 1946)
El colmillo de Buda (Juan Bustillo Oro, 1949)
Las tandas del Principal (Juan Bustillo Oro, 1949)
Recién casados... no molestar (Fernando Cortés, 1950)
Tres citas con el destino (F. Rey, F. Fuentes & L. Klimovsky, 1954)

As writer/director
Mischievous Susana (1945)
Las casadas engañan de 4 a 6 (1945)
El amor las vuelve locas (1946)
Los maridos engañan de 7 a 9 (1946)
No te cases con mi mujer (1947)
Te besaré en la boca (1949)
El charro y la dama (1949)
El pecado de quererte (1949)
Recién casados... no molestar (1950)
La liga de las muchachas (1950)
Amanecer a la vida (1950)
El beisbolista fenómeno (1951)
Hay un niño en su futuro (1951)
Venezuela también canta / Olimpiadas musicales (1951)
El luchador fenómeno (1952)
Ni pobres ni ricos (1952)
The Loving Women (1953)
Mis tres viudas alegres (1953)
Miradas que matan (1953)
Viva la juventud (1955)
El campeón ciclista (1956)
Cómicos de la legua (1956)
Refifí entre las mujeres (1956)
El teatro del crimen (1956)
Pobres millonarios (1957)
 Puss Without Boots (1957)
Locos peligrosos (1957)
La odalisca No. 13 (1957)
Viaje a la luna (1957)
A sablazo limpio (1958)
A Thousand and One Nights (1958)
Échame a mí la culpa (1958)
Tres lecciones de amor (1958)
 Three Black Angels (1960)
 Comedians and Songs (1960)
El aviador fenómeno (1960)
Dios sabrá juzgarnos (1960)
La marca del muerto (1960)
Vacaciones en Acapulco (1960)
Un día de diciembre (1961)
Jóvenes y bellas (1961)
Quiero morir en carnaval (1961)
Los tres pecados (1965)
Luna de miel en condominio (1966)
Un latin lover en Acapulco (1967)
Me casé con un cura (1967)
Las vírgenes de la nueva ola (1969)
Las golfas (1969)
La casa de las muchachas (1969)
Los Beverly de Peralvillo (1971)
Tonta, tonta, pero no tanto (1972)
La criada bien criada (1972)
Pobre, pero...¡honrada! (1973)
Que familia tan cotorra! (1973)
Algo es algo dijo el diablo (1974)
La presidenta municipal (1975)
El miedo no anda en burro (1976)
La comadrita (1978)
Criada maravilla (1978)

Bibliography

External links

1909 births
1979 deaths